Samugari District is one of ten districts of the province La Mar in Peru.

References